Partulina crassa was a species of air-breathing land snail, a terrestrial pulmonate gastropod mollusk in the family Achatinellidae. This species was endemic to Hawaii in the United States. This species is now extinct.

References

Partulina
Extinct gastropods
Gastropods described in 1853
Taxonomy articles created by Polbot